Worthville is the name of some places in the United States:

 Worthville, Georgia
 Worthville, Kansas
 Worthville, Kentucky
 Worthville, North Carolina
 Worthville, Pennsylvania